Vivolta was a French pay-tv-channel devoted to the art of living launched on December 10, 2007. The channel ceased operations on December 31, 2018.

History
Created by Philippe Gildas and Gaspard de Chavagnac, the channel was published by Télévista. Initially named Vista, the channel had to change its name before its launch, due to a copyright dispute with the Microsoft giant for its Windows Vista software.

When it was launched, Vivolta targeted the senior public segment (50 to 65 years), considered to be more mobile than other age groups. Faced with the lack of audience, the programming is entirely revised to orientate since April 2010, towards a younger and more feminine audience.

In March 2012, Discovery International France took a 20% stake in Televista to accompany the latter in its bid to obtain a TNT (Télévision numérique terrestre en France) frequency and in strengthening the Vivolta channel.

Programming
Vivolta presented itself as "the channel of the art of everyday feminine living", since 2010 the company Televista has become beneficiary, three years after its launch.

From 2010 to 2012, Vivolta programming dealt with practical and everyday questions about family, couple, well-being, psychology, home, cooking. Her core targeted women aged 25 to 49. Since September 2012, Vivolta had evolved its programming into lifestyle entertainment programs.

Broadcasting
It was initially exclusive on CanalSat and Numericable until 2011 when it arrives at ADSL operators. Having very bad audiences, it ceased broadcasting on satellite and on Canalsat on 31 March 2014. It is no longer broadcast on SFR since 4 May 2015.

Vivolta was broadcast on French ISP networks (Orange, SFR and Free), on certain cable networks in France, Belgium, Luxembourg and Switzerland (Numericable, BeTV) and on Proximus TV.

References

External links
 

Television stations in France
Defunct television channels in France
Television channels and stations established in 2007
2007 establishments in France
Discovery, Inc.
Television channels and stations disestablished in 2018